Compsilura concinnata (tachinid fly; order Diptera) is a parasitoid native to Europe that was introduced to North America in 1906 to control the population of an exotic forest, univoltine, spongy moth named Lymantria dispar. It is an endoparasitoid of larvae and lives with its host for most of its life. Eventually the parasitoid ends up killing the host and occasionally eating it. It attacks over 200 host species, mainly insects from the Orders: Coleoptera, Lepidoptera and Hymenoptera. Since this parasite has the ability to attack many different types of hosts, the organism has spilled over from the intended forest systems into other areas, like agricultural fields, affecting cabbage pests including the cabbage looper (Trichoplusia); the cabbage worm (Pieris rapae); and even other invasive species such as the brown-tail moth. However, it also attacks native, non-pest insects such as the Cecropia moth and American moon moth.

Morphology
Larvae are creamy colored and have black mouth hooks with three anal hooks. Pupae, the life stage in insects when undergoing transformation, are brown, 6.5 mm long and oval shape. Adult flies look very similar in its size/shape to the house-fly. Adults have a white face and a thorax containing four black stripes and reach up to 7.5 mm long.

Life cycle
C. concinnata is ovoviviparous. In a year, approximately 3–4 generations occur (multivoltine) with an adult life span of 5–22 days. The parasitoid larvae typically survive winters in host larvae; so since the spongy moths overwinter as an egg, it has to find alternative hosts to overwinter in their larvae. After mating has occurred, the adult female looks for host larvae. If a host meets her satisfaction for her offspring, she attaches on the host’s back using her anal hooks, punctures the integument of the host with a piercing structure on her abdomen and injects a single larva into the host's midgut or body cavity. The female produces about 100 larvae. She will sometimes attack the same host multiple times. If she injects a larva directly into the host's body cavity, it will quickly migrate to the midgut and penetrate it where three larvae stages occur. Compsilura concinnata remains a larva for only 10–17 days while waiting for its host's pupation when it will emerge from its host to pupate on another substrate or soil.

The larva typically kill its host in about 10 days. After emerging from a host, the white maggot forms a smooth, reddish brown case called a puparium around itself. During the next stage of its life cycle, the larva will molt into a pupa inside of the puparium.

What makes this parasitoid successful on numerous host-species is its flexible life cycle. It has the ability to alter its cycle based on the host it inhabits.

Impact after introduction to North America
Compsilura concinnata has a negative impact on many species of Lepidoptera native to North America.
 The fly is multivoltine while the main target for its introduction, the spongy moth is univoltine.
 Since the host spongy moth overwinters as eggs, the parasitoid fly found non-target species in which to overwinter.
 Due to its flexible life cycle, this parasitoid can parasitize more than 150 species of butterfly and moth in North America.

Parasitism 
Although C. concinnata was introduced to North America to control the spongy moth population, it typically only parasitizes less than 5% of the spongy moths during an outbreak. However the percentage of infected moths does increase as the populations tend to decline. As a result of the parasitoid's ability to attack many other species, it is not always an effective parasitoid of spongy moths compared to other parasites.

References 

Insects used as insect pest control agents
Insects described in 1824
Taxa named by Peter Friedrich Bouché
Diptera of Africa
Diptera of Europe
Diptera of Australasia
Exoristinae